Eastern Market is a Washington Metro station in the Capitol Hill neighborhood of Washington, D.C., United States. The island platformed station was opened on July 1, 1977, and is operated by the Washington Metropolitan Area Transit Authority (WMATA). The station currently provides service for the Blue, Orange, and Silver Lines. The station is located in Southeast D.C. at Pennsylvania Avenue and 7th Street. It is named after the nearby Eastern Market, a historic public marketplace.

History

Originally, the station was to be named Marine Barracks, after the Washington Marine Barracks located a few blocks south of the station on 8th Street. However, after lobbying from the Capitol Hill Restoration Society, the name was changed to Eastern Market. The station opened on July 1, 1977. Orange Line service to the station began upon the line's opening on November 20, 1978. Silver Line service at Eastern Market began on July 26, 2014.

Station layout

References

External links
 

 The Schumin Web Transit Center: Eastern Market Station
 7th Street entrance from Google Maps Street View

Stations on the Blue Line (Washington Metro)
Stations on the Orange Line (Washington Metro)
Stations on the Silver Line (Washington Metro)
Washington Metro stations in Washington, D.C.
Railway stations in the United States opened in 1977
1977 establishments in Washington, D.C.
Capitol Hill
Railway stations located underground in Washington, D.C.